Admiral Collins may refer to:

John Augustine Collins (1899–1989), Royal Australian Navy vice admiral
LeRoy Collins Jr. (1934–2010), U.S. Navy rear admiral
Napoleon Collins (1814–1875), U.S. Navy rear admiral
Thomas H. Collins (born 1946), U.S.Coast Guard admiral